This is a list of Swedish television related events from 1996.

Events
Unknown - Robert Randquist wins the third season of Sikta mot stjärnorna, performing as Julio Iglesias.

Debuts

International
24 August -  Doctor Who (1963-1989, 2005–present) (ZTV)
5 November -  Happy Ness: Secret of the Loch (1995) (Filmnet)
??? -  Caroline in the City (1995-1999) (?)

Television shows

1990s
Sikta mot stjärnorna (1994-2002)

Ending this year

Births

Deaths

See also
1996 in Sweden

References